The 1953 North Down by-election was held on 15 April 1953. It was retained by his daughter, Patricia Ford, who was unopposed when she stood as the Unionist candidate. She became the first woman to sit as an Ulster Unionist MP but she stood down in the 1955 general election.

Result

External links 
A Vision Of Britain Through Time

References

1953 elections in the United Kingdom
By-elections to the Parliament of the United Kingdom in County Down constituencies
Unopposed by-elections to the Parliament of the United Kingdom in Northern Irish constituencies
20th century in County Down
April 1953 events in the United Kingdom
1953 elections in Northern Ireland